The name could refer to the following people:
Titus Veturius Geminus Cicurinus, consul in 494 BC.
Titus Veturius Geminus Cicurinus, consul in 462 BC and probable member of the first Decemvirate